Louis Lee Watson (born April 9, 1895) was an American football coach and college athletics administrator. He served as the head football coach at Virginia Normal and Industrial Institute—now known as Virginia State University–from 1921 to 1922 and at Howard University in 1923 and from 1925 to 1927. Watson graduated from Howard in 1917 and played football at Springfield College in Springfield, Massachusetts in 1919 and 1920.

In 1928, Watson began coaching at the Bordentown School in Bordentown, New Jersey. He returned to Howard in 1945 as athletic director.

Head coaching record

College

References

1895 births
Year of death missing
Howard Bison athletic directors
Howard Bison football coaches
Springfield Pride football players
Virginia State Trojans football coaches
High school football coaches in New Jersey
Howard University alumni
Sportspeople from Alexandria, Virginia
African-American coaches of American football
African-American players of American football
African-American college athletic directors in the United States
20th-century African-American sportspeople